Chen Ter-shing is a Taiwanese politician. He was the Vice Minister of Science and Technology in 2014–2017.

Early life
Chen obtained his bachelor's degree in law from National Chung Hsing University in 1974. He then obtained his master's and doctoral degree in the same field from Chinese Culture University in 1976 and 1994 respectively.

Early career
Chen passed the civil service senior examination for legal affairs in 1975 and special civil service level A examination for legal affairs in 1988.

See also
 Ministry of Science and Technology (Taiwan)

References

Living people
Political office-holders in the Republic of China on Taiwan
Chinese Culture University alumni
National Chung Hsing University alumni
Year of birth missing (living people)